Gol Cheshmeh or Gol Chashmeh or Golcheshmeh may refer to:
 Gol Cheshmeh, Ardabil
 Gol Cheshmeh, Golestan
 Gol Cheshmeh, Azadshahr, Golestan Province
 Gol Cheshmeh Culture and Technology Centre
 Golcheshmeh-ye Bala, Markazi Province
 Gol Cheshmeh, Qazvin

See also
 Cheshmeh Gol (disambiguation)